Tada-U Township is a township of Kyaukse District in the Mandalay Region of Myanmar (Burma).

Tada-U Township's urban area is sub-divided into 3 wards; while Tada-U Township's rural area is sub-divided into 61 village-tracts, which are further sub-divided into 164 villages.

Village tracts

References 

Townships of Mandalay Region